Simon Rivers (born Amardip Singh Nahal in 1978) is an English actor, known for portraying the role of Kevin Tyler in the BBC soap opera Doctors.

Life and career
Born in Birmingham, West Midlands to Sikh parents who had immigrated from the Punjab, he speaks fluent Hindi and Punjabi. When he was five, his family moved to Berkshire. Undertaking a series of supporting roles, he took a two-year degree course at RADA, followed by theatre work. Rivers stated that he changed his birth name, Amardip Singh Nahal, to the stage name Simon Rivers in order to "kick start his career". After taking parts in various television series, including Casualty, he played Dr Ameer Mowad in the two series of the BBC Wales production, Crash. In 2011, he began portraying the role of Dr. Kevin Tyler in the BBC daytime soap Doctors. He departed the soap on 30 October 2014.

References

External links

Living people
1978 births
English male stage actors
English male television actors
British male actors of Indian descent
English people of Indian descent
English Sikhs
Male actors from Birmingham, West Midlands
Alumni of RADA
21st-century English male actors
Date of birth missing (living people)